The Ohrid gudgeon (Gobio ohridanus) is a species of gudgeon, a small freshwater in the family Cyprinidae. It is endemic to Lake Ohrid in Macedonia and Albania.

References

 

Gobio
Fish described in 1924
Taxa named by Stanko Karaman
Freshwater fish of Europe